Clinton is the county seat of Van Buren County, Arkansas, United States. The population was 2,602 at the 2010 census, making it the most populous city in the county (reclaiming the distinction from the resort community of Fairfield Bay). The city was named for DeWitt Clinton, the New York governor who built the Erie Canal; he had also been a U.S. Senator from New York.

Geography 

The City of Clinton is situated on the shore of the Archey Fork, a tributary of the Upper Little Red River which flows into Greers Ferry Lake. This body of water is known for its rich and diverse fish habitat and recreational uses. A channelization project in 1982 following a major flood event has recently been re-engineered by The Nature Conservancy in cooperation with city officials and corporate sponsors. The multi-phase restoration project has witnessed the installation of a cantilevered stream bed, bank stabilization, and habitat regeneration. The restoration is now part of the city's historic downtown park and trail system.

Demographics

2020 census

As of the 2020 United States census, there were 2,509 people, 942 households, and 608 families residing in the city.

2000 census
As of the census of 2000, there were 2,283 people, 1,007 households, and 626 families residing in the city. The racial makeup of the city was 95.71% White, 0.04% Black or African American, 0.74% Native American, 0.13% Asian, 1.31% from other races, and 2.06% from two or more races.  2.67% of the population were Hispanic or Latino of any race.

There were 1,007 households, out of which 26.1% had children under the age of 18 living with them, 49.7% were married couples living together, 8.8% had a female householder with no husband present, and 37.8% were non-families. 35.5% of all households were made up of individuals, and 20.6% had someone living alone who was 65 years of age or older.  The average household size was 2.22 and the average family size was 2.87.

In the city, the population was spread out, with 23.1% under the age of 18, 7.5% from 18 to 24, 23.8% from 25 to 44, 23.6% from 45 to 64, and 22.0% who were 65 years of age or older.  The median age was 42 years. For every 100 females, there were 90.3 males.  For every 100 females age 18 and over, there were 85.3 males.

The median income for a household in the city was $22,206, and the median income for a family was $30,792. Males had a median income of $24,750 versus $19,152 for females. The per capita income for the city was $15,514.  About 15.7% of families and 17.9% of the population were below the poverty line, including 21.7% of those under age 18 and 16.7% of those age 65 or over.

Education 
Public education for elementary and secondary students is available from the Clinton School District with students graduating from Clinton High School. The Clinton mascot and athletic emblem is the Yellowjacket.

Chuckwagon Races
The National Championship Chuckwagon Races are held annually at the Bar of Ranch in Clinton. The event is a major tourist attraction drawing many thousands to the area each Labor Day weekend with rodeo and futurity events, auctions, live music performances, and the grand finale Snowy River race.

Tornado outbreak

On February 5, 2008 an EF4 tornado struck Clinton, killing three people and destroying many homes and businesses, including a boat manufacturing facility.

Notable people

 Bobby Burnett, AFL Rookie of the Year for 1966

 Jim Burnett, Chairman of the National Transportation Safety Board

  Clifton Clowers, World War I veteran, farmer, and inspiration for the Merle Kilgore song "Wolverton Mountain."

John Hargis, 1996 Olympic Gold Medalist swimmer is a 1992 Clinton high school graduate.

Jack Whillock Major League Baseball pitcher

References

External links
 Clinton AR Community Hub
 The City of Clinton Website
 Clinton Area Chamber of Commerce
 Greers Ferry Lake & Little Red River Tourism Association

Cities in Van Buren County, Arkansas
Cities in Arkansas
County seats in Arkansas
Populated places established in 1879